In mathematics, Hodge–Arakelov theory of elliptic curves is an analogue of classical and p-adic Hodge theory for elliptic curves carried out in the framework of Arakelov theory. It bears the name of two mathematicians, Suren Arakelov and W. V. D. Hodge.
The main comparison in his theory remains unpublished as of 2019.

Mochizuki's main comparison  theorem in Hodge–Arakelov theory states (roughly) that the space of polynomial functions of degree less than d on the universal extension of a smooth elliptic curve in characteristic 0 is naturally isomorphic (via restriction) to the d2-dimensional space of functions on the d-torsion points.
It is called a 'comparison theorem' as it is an analogue for Arakelov theory of comparison theorems in cohomology relating de Rham cohomology to singular cohomology of complex varieties or étale cohomology of p-adic varieties.

In  and  he pointed out that arithmetic Kodaira–Spencer map and Gauss–Manin connection may give some important hints for Vojta's conjecture, ABC conjecture and so on; in 2012, he published his Inter-universal Teichmuller theory, in which he didn't use Hodge-Arakelov theory but used the theory of frobenioids, anabelioids and mono-anabelian geometry.

See also
 Hodge theory
 Arakelov theory
 P-adic Hodge theory
 Inter-universal Teichmüller theory

References

Number theory
Algebraic geometry